Khayala Isgandarova (born 20 October 1988) is an Azerbaijan born Turkish chess player who holds the title of Woman International Master (WIM, 2009).

Chess career
In 2008 Khayala Isgandarova won Azerbaijani Girls' chess championship in age category U20. Twice won bronze medals in Azerbaijani women's chess championships (2007, 2008). In Turkish women's chess championship won silver (2015) and two bronze (2014, 2016) medals. In 2015 in Sharjah Khayala Isgandarova won international women's chess tournament Sharjah Cup.

Khayala Isgandarova played for Azerbaijan and Turkey in the Women's Chess Olympiads:
 In 2006, at first board in the 37th Chess Olympiad (women) in Turin (+2, =2, -7),
 In 2008, at fourth board in the 38th Chess Olympiad (women) in Dresden (+3, =3, -2),
 In 2010, at reserve board in the 39th Chess Olympiad (women) in Khanty-Mansiysk (+1, =2, -1),
 In 2012, at reserve board in the 40th Chess Olympiad (women) in Istanbul (+2, =3, -1),
 In 2014, at third board in the 41st Chess Olympiad (women) in Tromsø (+5, =2, -3),
 In 2016, at fourth board in the 42nd Chess Olympiad (women) in Baku (+3, =3, -1).

Khayala Isgandarova played for Azerbaijan and Turkey in the European Team Chess Championship:
 In 2007, at reserve board in the 7th European Team Chess Championship (women) in Heraklion (+0, =2, -1),
 In 2009, at fourth board in the 8th European Team Chess Championship (women) in Novi Sad (+3, =2, -2),
 In 2015, at fourth board in the 11th European Team Chess Championship (women) in Reykjavik (+3, =1, -2).

References

External links

Khayala Isgandarova chess games at 365Chess.com

1988 births
Azerbaijani female chess players
Turkish female chess players
Chess Woman International Masters
Sportspeople from Baku
Living people